Ruseștii Noi is a commune in Ialoveni District, Moldova. It is composed of two villages, Ruseștii Noi and Ruseștii Vechi.

It's also a very old village. First settlement being founded in 1524 by a russian priest

References

Communes of Ialoveni District

Legend

It's said that this Commune was founded by a russian priest on 10 April 1524.
This Village is one of the biggest villages in Republic of Moldova.
It's one of the most christian village in moldova. Also this village is very Eurosceptic. Many of the locals miss the Soviet era.

Origins

First People Came in what's today known as the neighboring Commune Ruseștii Vechi Vechi/Old Due to being Founded before Ruseștii Noi.

Fun Fact

There are more people that can speak russian than Kids 0-18